John Lade was a racehorse breeder.

John Lade may also refer to:

Sir John Lade, 1st Baronet (1st creation) (1662–1740), MP for Southwark
Sir John Lade, 2nd Baronet (1721–1747) of the Lade Baronets
Sir John Lade, 1st Baronet (2nd creation) (c. 1731–1759), MP for Camelford
Sir John Lade, 2nd Baronet (1759–1838) of the Lade Baronets